This is the complete list of Pan American Games medalists in judo from 1963 to 2019.

Men's events

Flyweight
56 kg

Extra Lightweight
60 kg

Half Lightweight
63 kg (1967–1975)
65 kg (1979–1995)
66 kg (1999–)

Lightweight
70 kg (1963–1975)
71 kg (1979–1995)
73 kg (1999–)

Half Middleweight
78 kg (1979–1995)
81 kg (1999–)

Middleweight
80 kg (1963–1975)
86 kg (1979–1995)
90 kg (1999–)

Half Heavyweight
93 kg (1967–1975)
95 kg (1979–1995)
100 kg (1999–)

Heavyweight
90 kg (1963)
+93 kg (1967–1975)
+95 kg (1979–1995)
+100 kg (1999–)

Open

Women's events

Flyweight
45 kg

Extra Lightweight
48 kg

Half Lightweight
52 kg

Lightweight
56 kg (1983–1995)
57 kg (1999–)

Half Middleweight
61 kg (1983–1995)
63 kg (1999–)

Middleweight
66 kg (1983–1995)
70 kg (1999–)

Half Heavyweight
72 kg (1983–1995)
78 kg (1999–)

Heavyweight
+72 kg (1983–1995)
+78 kg (1999–)

Open

References

Judo